{{Taxobox
| name = Acidaminobacter
| domain = Bacteria
| phylum = Bacillota
| classis = Clostridia
| ordo = Clostridiales
| familia = Clostridiaceae
| genus = Acidaminobacter
| binomial_authority =  Stams and Hansen 1985
| type_species = A. hydrogenoformans 
| subdivision_ranks = Species 
}}Acidaminobacter is a genus in the phylum Bacillota (Bacteria).

Etymology
The name Acidaminobacter derives from New Latin acidum aminum, amino acid, a rod bacter, nominally meaning "a rod", but in effect meaning a bacterium, a staff or rod; resulting in  Acidaminobacter, the amino acid rod bacterium.

Species
The genus contains a single species, Acidaminobacter hydrogenoformans (Stams and Hansen 1985,  type species of the genus). The specific name is based on New Latin hydrogenum (from Greek  húdōr (ὕδωρ), water; and gennaō (γεννάω), to produce) hydrogen (that which produces water, so called because it forms water when exposed to oxygen); Latin formans'', forming, giving hydrogen-forming.)

See also
 Bacterial taxonomy
 Microbiology

References 

Bacteria genera
Eubacteriales
Monotypic bacteria genera